This is a list of geographical features in the state of Hesse, Germany.

Mountain ranges 

 Hermannsberg
 Kellerwald
 Odenwald
 Rhön
 Spessart
 Taunus
 Vogelsberg
 Westerwald

Additional 
Emmet (Upland)

Hills

Rivers 

 Eder
 Fulda
 Kinzig
 Lahn
 Main
 Rhine
 Schwalm
 Werra
 Weser

Cities 

see List of cities in Germany and List of cities in Hesse by population

!
Hesse
Hesse
PLaces